The year 1951 in television involved some significant events.
Below is a list of television-related events during 1951.



Events 

 March 21 – XEW-TV began transmissions, being the second oldest in Mexico City, with the first one being XHTV.
 March 22 – RCA introduces an eight-pound (3.6 kg) monochrome television camera with a 53-pound (24 kg) backpack transmitter, both operated by batteries. It is the first portable television camera.
 May 28 – The US Supreme Court upholds the Federal Communications Commission's approval of the CBS color television system.
 May 31 – Nederlandse Televisie Stichting (NTS), as predecessor of Nederlandse Omroep Stichting Televisie (NOS), a first regular television broadcasting service started in Amsterdam, Netherlands.
 June 25 – CBS presents its first commercial color telecast featuring Arthur Godfrey, Ed Sullivan, and Faye Emerson.
 June – RCA demonstrates its new electronic color system.
 August 11 – The first baseball game is televised in color, a double-header between the Brooklyn Dodgers and the Boston Braves.
 September 4 – The first live transcontinental television broadcast occurs in San Francisco, California from the Japanese Peace Treaty Conference.
 September 29
 The first live sporting event broadcast coast-to-coast, a college football game between Duke University and the University of Pittsburgh, is televised by NBC.
 CBS broadcasts the first American football game in color, between the University of California and the University of Pennsylvania, at Philadelphia.
 September 30 – WXIA-TV signed on the air at 5 p.m., as WLTV on channel 8. It was the first full time ABC affiliate for Atlanta, taking it over from WSB-TV (channel 2) and WAGA-TV (channel 5).
 October 2
 Danish language television station, DR1, first launched in Copenhagen.
 NTS, The first television network in the Netherlands was launched at 8:15 pm.
 October 3 – The first live coast-to-coast network telecast of a World Series baseball game.
 October 12 – The Holme Moss transmitter is initiated in Northern England, making BBC Television available to the region for the first time.
 October 17 – Television broadcasts begin in Argentina from Primera Televisora Argentina on channel 7, Buenos Aires.
 October 20 – The CBS Eye logo makes its television debut.
 November 11 – Bing Crosby Enterprises demonstrates black-and-white video recording using a modified Ampex tape recorder.
 November 18 – Edward R. Murrow on See It Now presents a split screen view of the Brooklyn Bridge in New York City and the Bay Bridge in San Francisco. It has erroneously been referred to as the first live transcontinental telecast.
 December – TV Tupi in São Paulo (Brazil) begins broadcasting Sua Vida Me Pertence ("Your Life Belongs To Me") starring Vida Alves, pioneering the telenovela genre.
 December 24 – The first televised opera composed for television, Amahl and the Night Visitors by Gian Carlo Menotti, is broadcast by NBC.
 Ernie Kovacs' Time for Ernie and Ernie in Kovacsland television series premiere. Kovacs explores the boundaries of television technology with his use of camera tricks and special effects.

Programs/programmes

Debuts 
 January 3 – Dragnet, crime drama, on NBC (1951–1959 Series One B&W, 1967-1970 Series Two Color)
 January 8 - Say It with Acting, game show, on NBC.
 March 3 – Watch Mr. Wizard on NBC (1951–1965)
 March 12 - Miss Susan, soap opera on NBC (1951)
 June 2 - The daytime version of A Date with Judy debuts on ABC.
 June 16 – Faye Emerson's Wonderful Town, variety show, with Faye Emerson and Skitch Henderson, on CBS
 July 6 – Front Page Detective debuts on Dumont.
 July 16 – A British version of the What's My Line?, game show, on BBC (Like its American counterpart, it became one of the top-rated programs for the rest of the decade and made a celebrity of its host, Eamonn Andrews)
 August 3 - The Ad-Libbers, comedy sketch game show, on CBS. (1951)
 August 3 - Tales of Tomorrow, a science fiction anthology series on ABC (1951-1953)
 September 3 – The first long-running soap opera, Search for Tomorrow, on CBS (1951–1986)
 September 11 - The Bill Goodwin Show, a talk/variety program on NBC. (1951-1952)
 September 24 – Love of Life on CBS (1951–1980)
 October 15 – Situation comedy I Love Lucy, starring Lucille Ball with her real-life husband, Desi Arnaz, on CBS (1951–1957); produced on film in front of a studio audience, using three film cameras, instead of being broadcast live, and making Ball the world's first major female television star
 October 28 - Out There, a science fiction program on CBS (1951-1952)
 Television version of Amos & Andy (1951–1953)
 The Roy Rogers Show (1951–1957), on NBC, starring Roy Rogers and his wife, Dale Evans
 Hallmark Hall of Fame (1951–present)

The Honeymooners also began in 1951

Ending during 1951

Births

References